Burn Brigade is an album by baritone saxophonist Nick Brignola which was recorded in 1979 and released on the Bee Hive label.

Reception

The AllMusic review by Scott Yanow stated, "Three of the greatest baritone saxophonists of the post-1970 period teamed up for this jam-session date ... The music is often quite exciting (the horns battle each other to a draw) and is easily recommended to fans of the bebop baritone sax".

Track listing

Personnel
Nick Brignola, Ronnie Cuber (tracks 1, 3 & 5), Cecil Payne (tracks 1, 3 & 4) – baritone saxophone
Walter Davis Jr. – piano (tracks 1 & 3-5)
Walter Booker – bass
Jimmy Cobb – drums

References

Nick Brignola albums
1980 albums
Bee Hive Records albums